The Ministry of Enterprise and Innovation is a ministry within the government of Sweden. Ministerial responsibilities include: housing, transport, IT and mail policies, regional growth, infrastructure, environmental issues and rural policy. Between 1969 and 1991, it was known as the Ministry of Industry.

The ministry offices are located at the old Central Post Office Building in central Stockholm.

Organization 
The Ministry of Enterprise and Innovation is headed by the Minister for Business, Industry and Innovation, Ebba Busch. Environmental issues are also under the purview of the Ministry, and these are headed by Minister for Climate and the Environment, Romina Pourmokhtari.

Government agencies 
The Ministry of Enterprise and Innovation is principal for the following government agencies:

References

External links 
 

Enterprise and Innovation
Sweden
Sweden
Forestry in Sweden
Transport organizations based in Sweden
1969 establishments in Sweden